The Seventh Battle of the Isonzo was fought from September 14–17, 1916 between the armies of the Kingdom of Italy and those of Austria-Hungary. It followed the Italian successes during the Trentino Offensive and the Sixth Battle of the Isonzo in the spring of 1916.

Battle 
A short, sharp encounter fought from 14 to 17 September 1916, the Seventh Battle of the Isonzo saw Italian Chief of Staff Luigi Cadorna shift his focus from broad-based diversionary attacks to tightly focused initiatives directed at single targets. This latest Isonzo battle saw the Italian Third Army, with a large amount of artillery, attack on the Carso toward Nova Vas. Following a successful first day, Nova Vas was assaulted on the second day with substantial artillery bombardments on German bunkers. Within minutes of the Italians ceasing fire, the Austro-Hungarian forces surrendered.

Nevertheless, Cadorna's continued offensives along the Soča (Isonzo) did succeed in wearing away at Austro-Hungarian resources, both in terms of manpower and in crucial artillery availability.  As each battle proceeded the Italians' war of attrition seemed ever more likely to wear the Austro-Hungarians into defeat, short of assistance from their German allies.

The Eighth Battle of the Isonzo followed on 10 October 1916.

See also

First Battle of the Isonzo - 23 June–7 July 1915
Second Battle of the Isonzo - 18 July–3 August 1915
Third Battle of the Isonzo - 18 October–3 November 1915
Fourth Battle of the Isonzo - 10 November–2 December 1915
Fifth Battle of the Isonzo - 9–17 March 1916
Sixth Battle of the Isonzo - 6–17 August 1916
Eighth Battle of the Isonzo - 10–12 October 1916
Ninth Battle of the Isonzo - 1–4 November 1916
Tenth Battle of the Isonzo - 12 May–8 June 1917
Eleventh Battle of the Isonzo - 19 August–12 September 1917
Twelfth Battle of the Isonzo - 24 October–7 November 1917 also known as the Battle of Caporetto

References

External links
FirstWorldWar.Com: The Battles of the Isonzo, 1915-17
Battlefield Maps: Italian Front
11 battles at the Isonzo
The Walks of Peace in the Soča Region Foundation. The Foundation preserves, restores and presents the historical and cultural heritage of the First World War in the area of the Isonzo Front for the study, tourist and educational purposes.
The Kobarid Museum (in English) 
Društvo Soška Fronta (in Slovenian)
Pro Hereditate - extensive site (in En/It/Sl)

Isonzo 07
Isonzo 07
Isonzo 07
Isonzo 07
the Isonzo
1916 in Italy
1916 in Austria-Hungary
September 1916 events